Utah Property Management Associates (UPMA), formerly Zions Securities Corporation (ZSC), is a subsidiary of Property Reserve Inc., which manages property owned by the Corporation of the President of The Church of Jesus Christ of Latter-day Saints (LDS Church) mostly in Salt Lake City, Utah. They manage major corporate, residential, and retail spaces along with parking lots and plazas.

In January 2012, Zions Securities Company changed its name to Utah Property Management Associates, LLC. UPMA is part of the Investment Properties Management Department of the LDS Church.

Properties

Commercial properties

UPMA currently owns and operates the following commercial properties in Downtown Salt Lake City:
Class A Commercial buildings
 Beneficial Tower
 Deseret News Building
 Eagle Gate Plaza & Office Tower
 Key Bank Tower
 Social Hall Plaza
 Triad Center
 Zions Bank Building

Class B Commercial buildings
 139 East South Temple
 J. C. Penney Building

Other Commercial buildings
 Deseret Book Building
 Eagle Gate Parking Plaza
 McIntyre Building
 Orpheum Office Plaza

Residential properties
UPMA currently owns and operates the following residential properties, all of which are in Salt Lake City, Utah, except as noted.
 Brigham Apartments 
 Colonial Court Apartments 
 Eagle Gate Apartments 
 Gateway Condominiums 
 West Temple Apartments 
 Garden Apartments 
 First Avenue Apartments 
 Hanover East Paces Apartments (Atlanta, Georgia)

Mixed use properties

 City Creek Center (Salt Lake City, Utah)
 Lake Park Corporate Centre (Salt Lake City, Utah)
 Highbury at Lake Park (West Valley City, Utah)
 Shoal Creek Valley (near Liberty, Missouri)
 1600 Vine Street Complex (Philadelphia, Pennsylvania)

Former properties
 ZCMI Center Mall (Salt Lake City, Utah) - Demolished for City Creek Center development
 Inn at Temple Square (Salt Lake City, Utah) - Demolished for City Creek Center development

References

External links
 
 About Zions Securities Corporation from DMC

Companies based in Salt Lake City
Real estate companies established in 1922
1922 establishments in Utah